A list of films produced by the Bollywood film industry based in Mumbai in 2001:

Highest-grossing films
The top 10 highest worldwide grossing Bollywood films of 2001 are as follows:

List of released films

References

External links
 Bollywood films of 2001 at the Internet Movie Database

2001
Bollywood
 
2001 in Indian cinema